Odela is a village in Odela mandal of Peddapalli district of the Indian state of Telangana. Odela Mallikarjuna swamy devasthanam is one of the popular pilgrimage centers in Telangana. Every year in summer thousands of people will come visit the temple from all over the Telangana and Andhra Pradesh.
Sri Mallikarjuna Swamy temple of Lord Shiva is located about 2 km from the Odela village and Mandal, Peddapalli District in Telangana, India.

Sri Bramarambha Mallikarjuna Swamy vari Tiru Kalyana Mahotsavam celebrated grandly every year. Devotees from various cities participate the kalyana mahotsavam.

Activities
Nakabali, Ammavariki Kunkumarchana, Grama paryatana vuregimpu, Maha Shivaratri parvadinam saamuhika rudrabhishekam, Archanalu Radotsavamu,
Ugadi, Bandlu tiruguta, Vahana Poojalu. Sree Rama Navami, Sree Seetha Ramula Kalyanam, Toli Ekadasi, Pedda Patnamulu - Agni gunda Mahotsavamulu, Swamy variki mahanyasa poorvaka ekkadasha redrabhishekamulu, dakshma yaam kadha sravanamu, gelupu utsavamulu, Saamuhika laksha Jwalarchana, Vinayaka Chavithi, Navarathri Utsavalu, Dussera, Vijaya Dasami (Shami Pooja), Karthika pournami Deepotsavamu.

The village is connected by rail and road. The village falls on the train route between Delhi and Chennai between the Kazipet and Balarshah divisions of Indian Railway. Daily there are three trips of government Bus which connects it to nearby small town Sultanabad, which falls on the state highway No 1 connecting the state capital Hyderabad and Ramagundam, known as Rajiv Rahadhari.

People of this village are mostly farmers, mainly cultivating paddy, corn and cotton.

History 
Once upon a time in a dense forest a sage called Sri Pankaj Maha Muni lived and he used to offer prayers to the Shiva Lingam every night. There are inscriptions on the temple pillar which substantiates the story. As the time rolled by, the sage died and the Shiva Lingam that he worshipped was covered under the nests of ants. Some years later, a farmer by name Chinthakunta Odelu was tilling his land. His plough suddenly struck the Shivalingam. He took it out and constructed a temple around it.

There are sub-shrines in the temple for Lord Sri Rama and village deities Bangaru Pochamma and Madana Pochamma temples. On the southern side of the temple is Sri Bramarambha Mata; on the northern side is Sri Veerabhadra Swamy; on the western side of the temple is Veera Shaiva Mattam; on the westernside there is big banyan tree known as Matta Marri. Lord Shri Bhairava Swamy is seen here as Kshetra Palaka. On the northeastern side of the temple there are idols of Lord Shiva in the form of Shri Khandiswara Swamy and that of two local ardent devotees of Lord Shiva, Medala Devi and Ketamma.

Karimnagar (50 km) is the nearest city to reach the temple. Karimnagar is connected to all the major cities of Telangana. Odela railway station is 2.9 km and Kazipet Railway Junction is 60 km from the temple.

Bhagyanagar express, and Kagaznagar express are the major trains available from Hyderabad City.

References

Villages in Peddapalli district